Cheeseboard may refer to:
 A cheese course of a meal
 Trencher (tableware)

See also
 Cheese Board Collective